The Coupe de France 1978–79 was its 62nd edition. It was won by FC Nantes which defeated AJ Auxerre in the Final.

Round of 16

Quarter-finals

Semi-finals
First round

Second round

Final

References

French federation

1978–79 domestic association football cups
1978–79 in French football
1978-79